José Javier Rodríguez is a Puerto Rican politician and the former mayor of Las Marías. Rodríguez is affiliated with the Popular Democratic Party (PPD) and has served as mayor from 2013 to 2017.

References

Living people
Mayors of places in Puerto Rico
Popular Democratic Party (Puerto Rico) politicians
People from Las Marías, Puerto Rico
Year of birth missing (living people)